This is a list of musicians who are known to be regular players of Rickenbacker guitars and basses.

Guitarists

 Cole Preston of Wallows
 Braeden Lemasters of Wallows
 Adam Anderson of Hurts
 Viv Albertine of The Slits
 Chad Allen of The Guess Who
 Jim Babjak of The Smithereens
 Randy Bachman of The Guess Who
 Kurt Ballou of Converge
 Peter Banks of Yes
 Andy Bell of Ride, Oasis and Beady Eye
 Kat Bjelland of Babes In Toyland and Katastrophy Wife 
 Mark Blackburn of Jacob's Trouble
 David Bryson of Counting Crows
 James Dean Bradfield of the Manic Street Preachers
 Carrie Brownstein of Sleater-Kinney
 Peter Buck of R.E.M.
 Jeff Buckley
 Mike Campbell of Tom Petty and the Heartbreakers
 Mary Chapin Carpenter
 Mark Crozer of The Jesus and Mary Chain
 Mike Connell of The Connells
 Jim Cuddy of Blue Rodeo
 Lenny Davidson of The Dave Clark Five
 Pat DiNizio of The Smithereens
 Pete Doherty of The Libertines
 Sherri DuPree of Eisley
 The Edge of U2
 Thomas Erak of the Fall of Troy
 Jay Ferguson of Sloan
 John Fogerty of Creedence Clearwater Revival
 Robert Forster of The Go-Betweens
 Les Fradkin of Beatlemania
 Glenn Frey of The Eagles
 Noel Gallagher of Oasis
 Craig Gannon of The Smiths
 Mark Gardener of Ride
 Per Gessle of Roxette
 Maurice Gibb of Bee Gees (1988-1994)
 Eric Goulden (Wreckless Eric)
 Dave Gregory of XTC
 Laura Jane Grace of Against Me!
 Sid Griffin of the Long Ryders and the  Coal Porters
 Neil Halstead of Slowdive
 George Harrison of The Beatles
 Lilly Hiatt
 Tony Hicks of The Hollies
 Susanna Hoffs of The Bangles
 James Honeyman-Scott of the Pretenders
 Keith Hopwood of Herman's Hermits
 Billie Joe Armstrong of Green Day
 Steve Howe of Yes
 Kenny Howes
 James Iha  of  The Smashing Pumpkins
 Daniel Johns  of  Silverchair
 Brian Jones of the Rolling Stones
 Paul Kantner of Jefferson Airplane
 John Kay of Steppenwolf
 Daniel Kessler of Interpol
 Ezra Koenig of Vampire Weekend
 Jesse Lacey of Brand New
 Denny Laine of The Moody Blues
 Geddy Lee of Rush
 John Lennon of The Beatles
 Yegor Letov of Grazhdanskaya Oborona
 Courtney Love of Hole
 Laura Marling
 Johnny Marr of The Smiths
 Gerry Marsden of Gerry & The Pacemakers
 Chris Martin of Coldplay
 Paul McCartney of The Beatles
 Roger McGuinn of The Byrds
 Grant McLennan of The Go-Betweens
 John McNally of The Searchers
 Remi Matsuo of Glim Spanky
 Wendy Melvoin of Prince and The Revolution
 Dave Meros of Spock's Beard
 Graham Nash of The Hollies
 Ed O'Brien of Radiohead
 Christopher Owens of Girls
 Kevin Parker of Tame Impala
 Mike Pender of The Searchers
 Tom Petty of Tom Petty and the Heartbreakers
 Guy Picciotto of Fugazi
 Sergio Pizzorno of Kasabian
 Johnny Ramone of Ramones
 Jim Reeves
 Tim Rogers of You Am I
 Tom Rowley of Milburn
 Michael Rutherford of Genesis and Mike + The Mechanics
 Charlie Sexton of Arc Angels
 Tommy Shaw of Styx
 Matt Skiba of Alkaline Trio
 Brix Smith Start of The Fall
 Elliott Smith
 Fred "Sonic" Smith of MC5 and Sonic's Rendezvous Band
 Rick Springfield
 Bernard Sumner of New Order and Joy Division
 Toots Thielemans
 Pete Townshend of The Who
 Chris Urbanowicz of Editors
 Robert van der Kroft
 Steven Van Zandt of The E Street Band
 Stevie Ray Vaughan
 Pål Waaktaar of a-Ha
 Dave Wakeling of The English Beat
 Miles Holmwood of Stereos
 Jeff Walls of Guadalcanal Diary
 Joe Walsh of The Eagles
 Paul Weller of The Jam and The Style Council
 Paul Westerberg of The Replacements
 Marty Willson-Piper of The Church
 Carl Wilson of The Beach Boys
 Dwight Yoakam
 Thom Yorke of Radiohead
 Robin Zander of Cheap Trick

Bassists
James Fripp of Dustlight
 Lemmy of Motörhead
 Gaye Advert of The Adverts
 Geddy Lee of Rush
 Martin Eric Ain of Celtic Frost
 André 3000 of Outkast
 Chris Baio of Vampire Weekend
 Lou Barlow of Dinosaur Jr
 Guy Berryman of Coldplay
 Zeta Bosio of Soda Stereo
 Rob Bryan of Be-Bop Deluxe
 Cliff Burton of Metallica
 Geezer Butler of Black Sabbath
 Johnny Christ of Avenged Sevenfold
 Al Cisneros of Sleep and Om
 Les Claypool of Primus
 Paul D'Amour of Tool
 Alan Davey of Hawkwind
 John Deacon of Queen
 Joey DeMaio of Manowar
 Steve DiGiorgio of bands such as Sadus, Dark Hall & Testament
 Dave Dreiwitz of Ween
 John Entwistle of The Who
 Bruce Foxton of The Jam
 Nikolai Fraiture of the Strokes
 Maurice Gibb of The Bee Gees
 Martin "Youth" Glover of Killing Joke
 Roger Glover of Deep Purple
 Hellmut Hattler of Kraan
 Kim Gordon of Sonic Youth
 Martin Gordon of Sparks, Jet and Radio Stars.
 Graham Gouldman of 10cc
 Bob Hardy of Franz Ferdinand
 Haruko Haruhara of FLCL
 Glenn Hughes of Deep Purple
 Rick James
 Pete Trewavas of Marillion
 Tony James of Generation X
 Inge Johansson of Against Me! and The (International) Noise Conspiracy
 Eric Judy of Modest Mouse
 Jesse F. Keeler of Death From Above 1979
 Steve Kille of Dead Meadow
 Jack Lawrence of The Raconteurs
 Russell Leetch of Editors
 Brent Liles of Social Distortion and Agent Orange
 Tony Lombardo of Descendents
 Philip Lynott of Thin Lizzy
 Dan Maines of Clutch
 Paul McCartney of The Beatles & Wings
 Randy Meisner of The Eagles
 Dave Meros of Spock's Beard
 Mike Mesaros of The Smithereens
 Mike Mills of R.E.M.
 Gary "Mani" Mounfield of Primal Scream & The Stone Roses
 Mario Mutis of Los Jaivas
 Nick O'Malley of Arctic Monkeys
 Nick Oliveri of Queens of the Stone Age & Kyuss
 Jerry Only of The Misfits
 Prescott Niles of The Knack
 Chuck Panozzo of Styx
 David Paton of Pilot
 Ian Peres of Wolfmother
 Tom Petersson of Cheap Trick
 Tracy Pew of The Birthday Party
 Steve Priest of Sweet
 Peter Quaife of The Kinks
 Scott Reeder of Kyuss
 Kira Roessler of Black Flag and Dos
 Chris Ross of Wolfmother
 Michael Rutherford of Genesis
 Troy Sanders of Mastodon
 Timothy B Schmit of The Eagles
 Paul Simonon of The Clash
 Chris Squire of Yes
 Tommy Stinson of The Replacements
 Mark Stoermer of The Killers
 Ray Shulman of Gentle Giant
 Leon Sylvers III of The Sylvers and Dynasty
 Chris Taylor of Grizzly Bear
 John Taylor of Duran Duran
 Dougie Thomson of Supertramp
 Fred Turner of Bachman–Turner Overdrive
 Sid Vicious of Sex Pistols
 Roger Waters of Pink Floyd
 Kieren Webster of The View
 Josephine Wiggs of The Breeders
 Paul Wilson of Snow Patrol
 Nicky Wire of Manic Street Preachers
 Christopher Wolstenholme of Muse
 Allen Woody of Gov't Mule and The Allman Brothers Band
 Bill Wyman of The Rolling Stones
 Trevor Bolder of The Spiders from Mars, Uriah Heep, Wishbone Ash, Arnold Corns and Cybernaut
 Buddy Zabala of The Eraserheads and The Dawn
 Simon Gallup of The Cure
 Scott Pilgrim of Sex Bob-omb (fictional)
Greg Lake of Emerson, Lake, and Palmer
 Jenny Lee Lindberg of Warpaint
 Greg Spawton of Big Big Train
 Stanley Clarke
 Glen Matlock of Sex Pistols
 Gail Greenwood of Belly
 Paul Gray of The Damned and Eddie and the Hot Rods
Bill Nye the [Science Guy]]
 Megan Zeankowski of The Lemon Twigs

References

Rickenbacker